Theopoetics in its modern context is an interdisciplinary field of study that combines elements of poetic analysis, process theology, narrative theology, and postmodern philosophy. Originally developed by Stanley Hopper and David Leroy Miller in the 1960s and furthered significantly by Amos Wilder with his 1976 text, Theopoetic: Theology and the Religious Imagination.

In recent times there has been a revitalized interest with new work being done by two schools of thought in theopoetics.

One school values process theology and postmodern philosophy. It is led by individuals such as L. Callid Keefe-Perry, Rubem Alves, Catherine Keller, John Caputo, Peter Rollins, Scott Holland, Melanie May, Matt Guynn, Roland Faber, and others.

The other school of thought values the philosophical transcendentals as informed by classical theology. It is led by individuals such as Anne M. Carpenter of St. Mary’s College, California, and Richard Viladesau of Fordham University, with contributions from Brian Nixon of Veritas International University. This school of theo-poetics is influenced by the thought of Hans Urs von Balthasar as informed by a range of thinkers as divergent as Gregory of Nyssa, Thomas Aquinas, Maximus the Confessor, Dietrich Richard Alfred von Hildebrand, David Bentely Hart and Pavel Florensky.

Description 
Postmodern Theopoetics

The first school of theopoetics suggests that instead of trying to develop a "scientific" theory of God, as systematic theology attempts, theologians should instead try to find God through poetic articulations of their lived ("embodied") experiences. It asks theologians to accept reality as a legitimate source of divine revelation and suggests that both the divine and the real are mysterious — that is, irreducible to literalist dogmas or scientific proofs.

Theopoetics makes significant use of "radical" and "ontological" metaphor to create a more fluid and less stringent referent for the divine. One of the functions of theopoetics is to recalibrate theological perspectives, suggesting that theology can be more akin to poetry than physics. It belies the logical assertion of the principle of bivalence and stands in contrast to some rigid Biblical hermeneutics that suggest that each passage of scripture has only one, usually teleological, interpretation. The dismissal of the aesthetic as a living part of language has turned the academic enterprise of biblical studies and theology into a language more at home with lawyers than poets. Theopoetics is the art of using words and thoughts that speak to the reader in an aesthetic and existential way to inspire spirituality in the reader.

Whereas those who utilize a strict, historical-grammatical approach believe scripture and theology possess inerrant factual meaning and pay attention to historicity, a theopoetic approach takes an allegorical position on faith statements that can be continuously reinterpreted. Theopoetics suggest that just as a poem can take on new meaning depending on the context in which the reader interprets it, texts and experiences of the Divine can and should take on new meaning depending on the changing situation of the individual.

Classical Theopoetics

In the second school of theopoetics, the aim is drawn “from von Balthasar’s affirmation of poetic expression: when God speaks to us in the Incarnation, all qualities of human language—even being itself—are employed as created ‘grammar’ by which God expresses himself to us…With God at the center of expression, poetry becomes capable of an authentic role in theological language.”

This form of theo-poetics “requires the interplay of three massive fields of knowledge:  metaphysics, language, and Christology”  and is to be “sharply distinguished from the agnostic overtures of the ‘theo-poetics’ movement, whose lineage is not be found in the thought of Balthasar.”

Notable publications

Books 
 .
 .
 .
 Carpenter, Anne (2015). Theo-poetics : Hans Urs von Balthasar and the risk of art and being. University of Notre Dame Press. . OCLC 927188404.
 Cruz-Villalobos, Luis (2015). Theological Poetry. Foreword by John D. Caputo. Santiago de Chile: Hebel Ediciones  
 Cruz-Villalobos, Luis (2019). Wise Crimes. Santiago de Chile: Hebel Ediciones 
 Cruz-Villalobos, Luis (2019). Haikus al Cielo. Santiago de Chile: Hebel Ediciones 
 Cruz-Villalobos, Luis (2020). Pauper God. Theographies. Santiago de Chile: Independently Poetry 
 Cruz-Villalobos, Luis (2020). Poesía Teológica. Prólogo de John D. Caputo. 2da Ed. Santiago de Chile: Independently Poetry 
 Cruz-Villalobos, Luis & Lagunas, Samuel (2020). Plegarias Sórdidas. Santiago de Chile: Independently Poetry. 
 .
 .
 .
 .
 
 Nixon, Brian C. (2021). Beauty (and the Banana): A Theopoetic Aesthetic. Wipf & Stock, 
 
 Bronsink, Troy (2013), Drawn In: A Creative Process For Artists, Activists, and Jesus Followers, Paraclete, 
 Harrity, Dave (2013), Making Manifest: On Faith, Creativity, and the Kingdom at Hand, Seedbed, 
 Keefe-Perry, L. Callid (2014), Way to Water: A Theopoetics Primer, Cascade, 
 Garner, Phillip Michael (2017), Theopoetics: Spiritual Poetry for Contemplative Theology and Daily Living, Wipf and Stock, 
 Tagore, Rabindranath (1913/2019). Gitanjali: Song Offering. Santiago de Chile: Independently Poetry

See also
Biblical theology
Christian theology
Narrative or postliberal theology
Postmodern Christianity
Secular Theology
Theopoesis

References

External links
Theopoetics.net website
Theopoetics: A Journal of Theological Imagination, Literature, Embodiment, and Aesthetics
"Microtheology: Toward a theopoetic of the local" article
 Theological Poetry. Poetry (2015) By Luis Cruz-Villalobos. Foreword by John D. Caputo 
"Theopoetics: that the dead may become gardeners again" article, Cross Currents
"Theopoetic/theopolitic" article, Cross Currents

Process theology
Poetics
Continental philosophy
Theology